Joeri Jansen (born 28 May 1979 in Turnhout) is a Belgian athlete, specialised in the 800 m.

Biography
Jansen made his international breakthrough, when he was awarded the silver medal at the 2001 European Athletics U23 Championships. Four years later, he came in as 5th at the European Indoor Championship. He competed at the 2004 Summer Olympics and was eliminated in the heats.

Achievements

External links

1979 births
Living people
Belgian male middle-distance runners
Athletes (track and field) at the 2004 Summer Olympics
Olympic athletes of Belgium
Sportspeople from Turnhout
21st-century Belgian people